Emanuil Manolov (7 January 1860 – 2 February 1902) was a Bulgarian composer.

Born at Gabrovo, Manolov is thought to be one of the founders of the Bulgarian professional musical culture. He composed the first Bulgarian opera Siromahkinia, based on Ivan Vazov's work with the same title, consisting of two parts. Very popular are his works in the genres of the "kitka" and the school song. One of his famous works is the song "What a Girl I saw, Mama" (Kakva moma vidiah, mamo). He died at Kazanlak.

Honours
Manolov Glacier in Antarctica is named after Emanuil Manolov.

1860 births
1902 deaths
Bulgarian composers
People from Gabrovo
19th-century Bulgarian people